Anolis marron, the Jacmel gracile anole or Jacmel anole, is a species of lizard in the family Dactyloidae. The species is found in Haiti.

References

Anoles
Endemic fauna of Haiti
Reptiles of Haiti
Reptiles described in 1980